Carex skottsbergiana is a tussock-forming perennial in the family Cyperaceae. It is native to southern parts of Chile.

See also
 List of Carex species

References

skottsbergiana
Plants described in 1910
Taxa named by Georg Kükenthal
Flora of Chile